Hall Cove ( \'za-liv 'hol\) is the 2.85 km wide cove indenting for 1 km the northwest coast of Nelson Island in the South Shetland Islands, Antarctica.  Entered northeast of Smilets Point and southwest of Retamales Point.  The area was visited by early 19th century sealers.

The cove is named after John Hall of the British Antarctic Survey, for his support for the Bulgarian Antarctic programme.

Location
British mapping in 1968.

Maps
 Livingston Island to King George Island.  Scale 1:200000.  Admiralty Nautical Chart 1776.  Taunton: UK Hydrographic Office, 1968.
 South Shetland Islands. Scale 1:200000 topographic map No. 3373. DOS 610 - W 62 58. Tolworth, UK, 1968.
 Antarctic Digital Database (ADD). Scale 1:250000 topographic map of Antarctica. Scientific Committee on Antarctic Research (SCAR). Since 1993, regularly upgraded and updated.

References
 Hall Cove. SCAR Composite Gazetteer of Antarctica.
 Bulgarian Antarctic Gazetteer. Antarctic Place-names Commission. (details in Bulgarian, basic data in English)

External links
 Hall Cove. Copernix satellite image

Coves of the South Shetland Islands
Bulgaria and the Antarctic